is a Japanese actor, kabuki actor and boxing commentator.

Biography
Born in 1965, his parents are the kabuki actor Ichikawa Ennosuke III and the cinema actress Yuko Hama. His grandmother is the film actress Sanae Takasugi.

In the Kabuki world, it is usual for the son of an actor to follow the father's footsteps from a very early age, but his parents divorced in 1968 and his mother was given custody. After that, he totally lost contact with his father, and his mother refused to give him any training in the Kabuki art and he grew believing that it was "something that must not be watched".
However he tried several times to meet his biological father. When he was 20, he went to one of his performances and asked if he could see him, stating that he was Ennosuke's son, but when his father's assistants reported to him the situation he refused, stating that he didn't have any son.

He graduated in social psychology at the University of Tokyo and decided to start a career in cinema.

Sexual misconduct allegations

On August 24th, 2022, a Japanese media outlet reported that Kagawa had forcibly touched a woman in July, 2019. Kagawa admitted to the sexual misconduct through his agency, Lotus Roots, on August 25th, 2022.

Career
He has twice been nominated for the Best Supporting Actor award at the Japanese Academy Awards, once for Warau Iemon and once for Kita no zeronen. He won the award for best supporting actor at the 33rd Japan Academy Prize for Mt. Tsurugidake.

Reconciliation with his father

His first son Masaaki, born in 2004, showed interest in becoming a Kabuki actor. As a result, Teruyuki tried again to meet with his aged father and succeeded.

At the same time, he decided to start his own career in Kabuki at 46, an age which is extremely unusual for an actor. The only other time someone was initiated into the Kabuki world as a fully grown adult was in 1910, when Ichikawa Danjuro IX's adopted and then son-in-law Ichikawa Sansho V decided to start his career at age 28 after his adoptive father's death.

In June 2012, it was announced at their father and cousin's Shūmei that he and his son would take the names of Ichikawa Chusha IX and Ichikawa Danko V.

Filmography

Film

Television drama

Other television

Awards
Teruyuki Kagawa was honored with the John Rabe Award in 2009 by the John Rabe Communication Centre in Heidelberg and the Austrian Peace Service.

References

External links
 

1965 births
Living people
Japanese male film actors
Japanese male television actors
Male actors from Tokyo
University of Tokyo alumni
Kabuki actors
20th-century Japanese male actors
21st-century Japanese male actors